The 2007–08 A1 Grand Prix of Nations, Australia is an A1 Grand Prix race held on 3 February 2008 at the Eastern Creek Raceway in Sydney, Australia. This was the sixth race in the 2007–08 A1 Grand Prix season.

Pre-race 
Fairuz Fauzy who drove in the inaugural 2005–06 season replace this weekend Alex Yoong in the A1 Team Malaysia car. Yoong had the longest run of consecutive starts with 45 successive starts.

For his home race, A1 Team Australia renamed its cars as Jackaroo. The name was chosen between the Australian symbol propositions done by fan in the official team site.

Since Taupo round, A1GP cars used a 30 per cent biofuel mix. A1 Grand Prix continued its environmental campaign in Australia using electric generators for all the paddock's temporary and ancillary structures provided by Active Power Management and initiated by THINK Greener Racing.

Qualifications 
Once again, the practice sessions were dominated by France in Friday wet and Saturday humid weather conditions.

On Friday night, Portugal practice their pit stops and a tyre gun hose that became disconnected hit accidentally the leg of James Goodfield, the race engeener of the next door garage, Great Britain. James Goodfield sustain a broken leg and was carry up to the hospital.

Chris Alajajian, driver of the Lebanon, made a mistake on his first out lap for Sprint race qualifying spinning and hitting the tyre barriers at Turn 5. The car was too much damaged to complete a flying lap during qualifying sessions. Lebanon after hard work to repair the car during the night, started both the Sunday races from the last grid position.

Canada was penalised because its driver, Robert Wickens, did not respect blue flags during the feature race qualifying hamping Sérgio Jimenez (Brazil). Robert Wickens lost his 8th qualifying position to 21st.

 (1) = No time for A1 Team Lebanon due to crash during Sprint qualifying.
 (2) = A1 Team Canada was penalised for blue flag disrecpet, losing its 8th position.

Sprint race 
This race is known as 'the race of two-halves' due to the track being dry in the first half with 27 °C, then become extremely difficult and wet. In first lap, the order is France, Switzerland, South Africa, New Zealand, Great Britain with a great start from the 8th, China, Germany and USA. Pakistan crash out in the first lap. Loïc Duval (France) made the fastest lap in Lap 2 and is pulling away.
In lap 7, the rain start and Adrian Zaugg (South Africa) is slipping down at Turn 1. Narain Karthikeyan (India) is going off too. Great Britain and Indonesia enter into the pits for wet tyres in lap 9. Cong Fu Cheng (China) spins off in Lap 10, Adam Carroll (Ireland) the next lap.
Robert Wickens (Canada) made an amazing race. He passes Ireland and Netherlands in Lap 11 takink 7th. At Turn 1, next lap, it grabs the 4th position passing four cars including Germany. One lap before the end of the Sprint race, France is leading followed by New Zealand, Switzerland, Canada, Germany, USA, Australia and South Africa.
Neel Jani (Switzerland) spin in the final lap. Loïc Duval (France) in his final round of racing for this A1GP season due to commitments in Japan, converted his pole position with a very comfortable win and breaking the 37-race win-drought, when France was a dominant team in A1GP's debut season. The final standing is France, New Zealand, Canada taking advantage of the rain and took a chance on not switching for wet tyre to climb from 15th, Germany, USA, Australia, South Africa, Brazil, Netherlands and Switzerland in 10th.

Main race 
It's 25 °C and soaking wet for the Main race. Jonny Reid (New Zealand), having qualified pole, halt on track after quitting the stand and must start the race from the pitlane. Loïc Duval (France), qualified fifth, is stuck on the grid at the start of the formation lap and must start the race second to last.
After the first lap, Ireland and India enter in pit to change their slicks tyres to wets. The order is Switzerland, Great Britain, South Africa, Brazil, USA, China, Germany, Czech Republic, Netherlands, and Canada. In the third lap, New Zealand is 19th and France 14th. Robert Wickens (Canada) grab the 9th to Tomáš Enge (Czech Republic) in Lap 3. In lap 7, New Zealand is already 14th and France in points at 10th. During Lap 9, Pakistan run off without damage. In the next lap, João Urbano (Portugal) spin off trying passes Chris Alajajian (Lebanon) who run off too. Pakistan, Czech Republic and China receive a drive-through penalty for making a false start. The pit window is now open in Lap 10.
Switzerland and Great Britain pit at same time and leave the stand in the same order. In Lap 13, South Africa leads France by 21 seconds but neither have made their pit stop. Adrian Zaugg (South Africa) take the lead after a quick pit stop in Lap 15. In the same lap, Robbie Kerr (Great Britain) run wide and lost a few seconds meanwhile Jonathan Summerton (USA) has gone off and Robert Wickens (Canada) passes. Finally, France makes is mandatory pit stop and South Africa set the current fastest lap in Lap 16.
After the pit window close, Canada and USA fight for 6th in Lap 17. Loïc Duval (France) join the battle and try to passes Jonathan Summerton (USA). In Lap 22, France hit USA, who give up, and receive a drive-through penalty for avoidable collision. Two laps before the opening of the pit for the second mandatories stops in Lap 26, John Martin (Australia) passes Robert Wickens (Canada).
Cong Fu Cheng (China) loses is 11th to 13th after spin in Lap 28, Satrio Hermanto spin also at turn 1, 2 laps after that. Switzerland takes the fasted lap. During his pit stop on lap 31, the French car have a clutch failure and Loïc Duval must renounce. Canada passes Germany for 6th and South Africa takes again the fasted lap on Lap 33. Later, Cong Fu Cheng (China) passes Narain Karthikeyan (India) fot 10th.
The 42nd lap is the last and South Africa win 19.560 seconds behind Switzerland, Great Britain, Brazil, Australia, Canada, Germany, Netherlands, New Zealand and China. New Zealand and France are now tied leading the championship with 96 points.

After race 
Due to commitment to race in Japan (Formula Nippon and Super GT) agreed before the start of the A1GP season, Loïc Duval announced he will not drive for France for the final three rounds of the 2007–08. His participation for the next South African round on 24 February was only confirmed 22 February.

Notes 
 It was the 28th race weekend (56 starts).
 It was the third venue in Eastern Creek Raceway and in Australia.
 It was the first race weekend for Jonathan Cochet and Michael Klein.
Records :
 France even up the 6 pole position of Switzerland.
 France score 10 fastest laps (6 rewarded by points).
 Lebanon participate on 28 rounds (56 starts) without won points since their first Grand Prix.
 Neel Jani score 232 points.

References

External links 
France wins Australia Sprint
Sprint race: lap-by-lap
Sprint Race Results
South Africa storms Sydney
Feature race lap-by-lap
Feature Race Results

A1 Grand Prix of Nations, Australia, 2007-08
A1 Grand Prix of Nations, Australia, 2007-08
Motorsport at Eastern Creek Raceway